The Lycoming IO-390 engine is a horizontally opposed, four-cylinder aircraft engine, manufactured by Lycoming Engines.

There is no carburetted version of the engine, which would have been designated O-390 and therefore the base model is the IO-390.

Design and development
The engine was originally conceived in the 1970s as the IO-400-X, but the project was never pursued.

The IO-390 was developed from the similar IO-360 engine,  to increase the O-360's cylinder bore. (Although the IO-390 cylinder assembly is not the same part number as the IO-580, the cylinder barrels of both have a 5.318 bore and 4.375 stroke dimension.)

It features a tuned induction system, roller tappets and Slick Start ignition. The engine has a fuel injection system which meters fuel in proportion to the induction airflow with fuel vaporization taking place at the intake ports. The cylinders have air-cooled heads.

The IO-390 was first introduced at AirVenture 2002. It has a factory recommended TBO of 2000 hours and requires a dynafocal engine mount.

The IO-390 was initially marketed through Lycoming's custom engine subsidiary, Thunderbolt Engines, prior to the engine's certification and was at that time only available for installation on non-certified aircraft. The IO-390 was certified on 30 March 2009 to FAR 33.

In January 2009 the base price of the IO-390-EXP version was USD$32,650.00.

In November 2009 Lycoming announced that it had obtained an FAA Supplemental Type Certificate to replace the originally fitted Lycoming O-360 engines in the Mooney M20E, M20F and M20J with a new or remanufactured IO-390-A3A6 engine. Also on November 12, 2009 Commander Aircraft received an STC for its model 112B using the MTV-12-B/188-59b propeller.

Variants

IO-390 models
IO-390-X
Four-cylinder, fuel-injected, horizontally opposed, air-cooled direct drive,  at 2700 rpm, dry weight , The "X" designation is a generic indicator for all engines in the family.
IO-390-EXP
Four-cylinder, fuel-injected, horizontally opposed, air-cooled direct drive,  at 2700 rpm, dry weight , non-certified engine for experimental aircraft assembled by Lycoming's Thunderbolt division.
IO-390-A1A6
The initial certified version: four-cylinder, fuel-injected, horizontally opposed, air-cooled direct drive,  at 2700 rpm. This model includes provisions for a single-action controllable-pitch propeller. Certified 30 March 2009.
IO-390-A1B6
Certified version: four-cylinder, fuel-injected, horizontally opposed, air-cooled direct drive,  at 2700 rpm. Same as the A1A6, except that the propeller governor is located on left front of crankcase. Certified 21 January 2010.
IO-390-A3A6
Certified version: four-cylinder, fuel-injected, horizontally opposed, air-cooled direct drive,  at 2700 rpm. This model includes provisions for a single-action controllable-pitch propeller. This model is similar to the A1A6 but has its propeller flange bushings reindexed. Certified 27 August 2009.
IO-390-A3B6
Certified version: four-cylinder, fuel-injected, horizontally opposed, air-cooled direct drive,  at 2700 rpm. Same as the A3A6 except that the propeller governor is located on left front of the crankcase. Certified 5 April 2012.
IO-390-C1A6
Certified version: four-cylinder, fuel-injected, horizontally opposed, air-cooled direct drive,  at 2700 rpm. This model is similar to the IO-390-A1A6, except with a lightweight oil sump, cold air induction housing, tuned intake pipes and an RSA-10 fuel injector. Certified 25 January 2016.
IO-390-C1B6
Certified version: four-cylinder, fuel-injected, horizontally opposed, air-cooled direct drive,  at 2700 rpm. This model is the same as the C1A6, except that the propeller governor is located on left front of the crankcase. Certified 25 January 2016.
IO-390-C3A6
Certified version: four-cylinder, fuel-injected, horizontally opposed, air-cooled direct drive,  at 2700 rpm. This model is the same as the C1A6, except that the propeller flange bushings are reindexed. Certified 25 January 2016.
IO-390-C3B6
Certified four-cylinder, fuel-injected, horizontally opposed, air-cooled direct drive,  at 2,700 rpm, dry weight 296 lb (134 kg). This model is the same as the C3A6, except that the propeller governor is located on left front of the crankcase. Used on Cirrus SR20 G6.

AEIO-390 models
AEIO-390-A1A6
Certified version: aerobatic, four-cylinder, fuel-injected, horizontally opposed, air-cooled direct drive,  at 2700 rpm. This model is the same as IO-390-A1A6, except that it is equipped with an inverted oil system kit for aerobatic flight. Certified 5 April 2012.
AEIO-390-A1B6
Certified version: aerobatic, four-cylinder, fuel-injected, horizontally opposed, air-cooled direct drive,  at 2700 rpm. This model is the same as IO-390-A1B6, except that it is equipped with an inverted oil system kit for aerobatic flight. Certified 5 April 2012.
AEIO-390-A3A6
Certified version: aerobatic, four-cylinder, fuel-injected, horizontally opposed, air-cooled direct drive,  at 2700 rpm. This model is the same as IO-390-A3A6, except that it is equipped with an inverted oil system kit for aerobatic flight. Certified 5 April 2012.
AEIO-390-A3B6
Certified version: aerobatic, four-cylinder, fuel-injected, horizontally opposed, air-cooled direct drive,  at 2700 rpm. This model is the same as IO-390-A3B6, except that it is equipped with an inverted oil system kit for aerobatic flight. Certified 5 April 2012.

Applications

Amateur-built aircraft
Bearhawk Companion
Glasair Sportsman
Ibis GS-750 Grand Magic
Lancair Barracuda
Lancair ES
MSW Votec 221
Pipistrel Panthera
Van's Aircraft RV-7
Van's Aircraft RV-8
Van's Aircraft RV-14
Van's Aircraft RV-15
Whisper X350 Generation II

Certified aircraft
Aura Aero Integral R - aerobatic  - certification in progress (2021)
Cessna 177RG - available in July 2009 under an STC
Cirrus SR20 - factory installed IO-390-C3B6  version on the SR20 G6 version
Mooney M20 E, F & J - available in November 2009 under an STC
Piper PA-28R Arrow - proposed under STC
Symphony SA-160 - proposed as a factory installed  version, but aircraft no longer in production
Tecnam P2010

Military Aircraft
 Lancair Synergy T-90 Colombian Air Force

Specifications (IO-390-A1A6)

See also
Lycoming O-360
List of aircraft engines

References

External links

2000s aircraft piston engines
IO-390
2002 introductions